Enrique Andrés Rouga (born March 2, 1982) is a Venezuelan footballer, and defender who plays in Spain for UD Las Zocas.

His former teams are: Caracas Fútbol Club and Junior Barranquilla. In 2007, he was sold to Alki Larnaca FC. On May 30, 2009, he moved to AEL Limassol.

External links
 
 Andrés Rouga at La Preferente

1982 births
Living people
Venezuelan footballers
Venezuela international footballers
2004 Copa América players
2007 Copa América players
Venezuelan Primera División players
Categoría Primera A players
Cypriot First Division players
Cypriot Second Division players
Caracas FC players
Atlético Junior footballers
Alki Larnaca FC players
AEL Limassol players
Ermis Aradippou FC players
Deportivo Táchira F.C. players
A.C.C.D. Mineros de Guayana players
Metropolitanos FC players
Estudiantes de Mérida players
Ayia Napa FC players
ASIL Lysi players
Venezuelan expatriate footballers
Expatriate footballers in Colombia
Expatriate footballers in Cyprus
Venezuelan expatriate sportspeople in Colombia
Venezuelan expatriate sportspeople in Cyprus
Venezuelan expatriate sportspeople in Spain
Association football defenders